Thinnakone Vongsa (Lao: ທິນນະກອນ ວົງສາ, born 20 March 1992) is a Laotian footballer who is currently playing as a defender.

Career statistics

International

References

1992 births
Living people
Laotian footballers
Laos international footballers
Association football defenders